{{Speciesbox
|image = Sorbus torminalis Full tree.jpg
|image_caption = A mature tree in spring
|taxon = Sorbus torminalis
|authority = (L.) Crantz
|range_map = Sorbus torminalis range.svg
|range_map_caption = Distribution map
|synonyms = 
 Torminalis clusii (Roemer) K.R.Robertson & J.B.Phipps
 Sorbus orientalis Schönb.-Tem.
 Crataegus torminalis L.
 Pyrus torminalis (L.) Ehrh
}}Sorbus torminalis, with common names wild service tree, chequers, and checker tree, is a species of tree in the mountain ash or rowan genus (Sorbus) of the rose family (Rosaceae), that is native to Europe, parts of northern Africa and western Asia.

Description
The bark is smooth and grayish, but flaky, peeling away in squarish plates to reveal darker brown layers. The fruit is a globose to ovoid pome 10–15 mm in diameter, greenish to russet or brown, patterned with small pale lenticel spots when mature in mid to late autumn.Mitchell, A. F. (1974). A Field Guide to the Trees of Britain and Northern Europe. Collins 

Taxonomy
There are two varieties:
 Sorbus torminalis var. torminalis. Europe, northwest Africa.
 Sorbus torminalis var. caucasica. Caucasus and Alborz Mountains. Leaves less deeply lobed than in var. torminalis.

The species has sometimes been placed in its own genus, Torminalis. Recent molecular phylogenetics confirms an earlier taxonomic opinion that the genus Sorbus as defined in the broad sense is not monophyletic, but the simple-leafed species traditionally included in Sorbus are a monophyletic group; this species would be included in a clade called Aria (genus Aria or Sorbus subgenus Aria) as the species Aria torminalis Beck.

It is a sexually reproducing diploid species that forms diploid and polyploid hybrids with members of subgenus Aria (whitebeams). A number of often very localised stable apomictic polyploid species of ultimately hybrid origin between Sorbus torminalis and various species in the subgenus Aria occur in Europe, including Sorbus latifolia (service tree of Fontainebleau), and S. bristoliensis (Bristol whitebeam).

 Etymology 
The tree's Latin name, torminalis means "good for colic".

The name "chequers" may have been derived from the ancient symbol of a pub being the chequer-board (as the fruit were once used to flavour beer) or the spotted pattern of the fruit, though some suggest it comes from the pattern of the bark on old trees.

Distribution and habitat
It is found from England and Wales east to Denmark and Poland, south to northwest Africa, and southeast to southwest Asia from Asia Minor to the Caucasus and Alborz mountains.

The wild service tree favours deep fertile soils, but can tolerate a wide range of soil conditions, from chalky, superficial, dry soils to temporarily waterlogged soils. It can adapt to a variety of climatic conditions, but occurs most often in lowlands. Wild service tree is a light-demanding species, often out-competed by other hardwood species.

It is relatively rare and in Britain is now usually confined to pockets of ancient woodland, although it can also be found growing in hedgerows. It can often be found associated with oak and ash woods, preferring clay and lime based soils. In Britain, summer temperatures are often too low for the seeds to ripen, so its principal method of propagation is by suckers.

Ecology
The fruits are eaten by many birds and a few mammals, making the tree ecologically important and appreciated by hunters.

Uses

The wild service tree is one of the most valuable hardwoods in Europe. The wood is fine-grained, very dense and has good bending strength. It was used in the past to make screws for winepresses, billiard cue sticks, musical instruments and turnery. Today, it is usually only used for decorative veneers.

The fruit, sometimes called "chequers", are edible and taste similar to dates, although they are now rarely collected for food. They are usually too astringent to eat until they are over-ripe and bletted. They were traditionally known as a herbal remedy for colic. Before the introduction of hops, the fruit were used to flavour beer.

Gallery

References

Further reading
 Wedig Kausch-Blecken von Schmeling: Die Elsbeere. Bovenden 1994, 
 Roper, P. (1993) "The distribution of the Wild Service Tree Sorbus torminalis (L.) Crantz, in the British Isles", Watsonia'', 19, pp. 209–229

External links

Wild Service Tree at rhs.org.uk
Sorbus torminalis - distribution map, genetic conservation units and related resources. European Forest Genetic Resources Programme (EUFORGEN)

torminalis
Flora of Europe
Flora of Asia
Flora of Africa
Trees of Mediterranean climate